Discovery  may refer to:
 Discovery (observation), observing or finding something unknown
 Discovery (fiction), a character's learning something unknown
 Discovery (law), a process in courts of law relating to evidence

Discovery, The Discovery or Discoveries may also refer to:

Film and television 
 The Discovery (film), a 2017 British-American romantic science fiction film
 Discovery Channel, an American TV channel owned by Warner Bros. Discovery
 Discovery (Canadian TV series), a 1962–1963 Canadian documentary television program
 Discovery (Irish TV series), an Irish documentary television programme
 Discovery (UK TV programme), a British documentary television programme
 Discovery (U.S. TV series), a 1962–1971 American television news program
 Star Trek: Discovery, an American television series
 USS Discovery (NCC-1031),  a fictional space craft on Star Trek: Discovery

Literature 
 The Discovery (Frances Sheridan play) (1763)
 The Discovery (Animorphs), children's book
 Discovery, a fictional space ship in Ursula Le Guin's Paradises Lost

Music 
 Discovery Records, a record label
 Discovery (band) an indietronica side project from members of Ra Ra Riot and Vampire Weekend
 Discovery, Op. 13, a song cycle by Howard Ferguson

Albums 
 The Discovery (album), a 2011 album by Born of Osiris
 Discovery (Larry Carlton album)
 Discovery (Daft Punk album)
 Discovery (Electric Light Orchestra album)
 Discovery (music video)
 Discovery (Jewelry album)
 Discovery (Mr. Children album)
 Discovery (Mike Oldfield album)
 Discovery Tour 1984
 Discovery (box set), a box set of Pink Floyd albums
 Discovery (Shanice album)
 Disc-Overy, a 2010 album by Tinie Tempah

Songs 
 "Discovery" (song), a song by Mamoru Miyano
 "Discovery", a song by Chris de Burgh from Beautiful Dreams
 "The Discovery", a 1974 instrumental Tyner McCoy from Echoes of a Friend

Schools
 
 Discovery College, a college in Hong Kong

Vehicles

Air and space
 Space Shuttle Discovery
 Aero Concepts Discovery, an American homebuilt aircraft design
 Offpiste Discovery, a British hang glider design
 SC Discovery, a Ukrainian paraglider design

Land 
 Land Rover Discovery & Discovery Sport, a 4×4 SUV

Marine 
 Discovery (1602 ship)
 Discovery (fireboat), a fireboat operating near the mouth of the Columbia River
 MV Discovery, a cruise ship
 HMCS Discovery, a Vancouver stone frigate
 HMS Discovery (1741), a 6-gun storeship
 HMS Discovery (1774), an 8-gun discovery vessel
 HMS Discovery (1789), a 10-gun sloop
 HMS Discovery (1874), a wood screw storeship
 Discovery (HBC vessel), built 1905, see Hudson's Bay Company vessels
 HSC HSS Discovery, a high-speed ferry
 RRS Discovery, the ship on Captain R.F. Scott's Antarctic expedition
 RRS Discovery (1962), a British Royal Research Ship
 RRS Discovery (2013), a British Royal Research Ship

Other uses
 Age of Discovery
 Discovery (apple), an apple cultivar
 Discovery (elm cultivar)
 Discovery (horse), an American thoroughbred racehorse
 Discovery (synth), a VSTi software synthesizer by discoDSP
 Discovery, Inc., a former American global media and entertainment company
 Warner Bros. Discovery, successor company formed by merger with WarnerMedia
 Discovery, Weymouth, a science centre in Dorset, England
 Wikimedia Discovery, a search engine project by the Wikimedia Foundation
 Discovery District, an area in Toronto that features hospitals and research institutions
 Discovery doctrine
 Discovery Institute, a non-profit public policy think tank
 Discovery Limited, a South African–based financial services group
 Discovery Program, a NASA space science program
 Service discovery on a computer network
 Discovery, a generation of Roomba robotic vacuuming devices
 Discovery Walks, natural trails in select parks in Toronto
 Discovery (video game), a Minecraft clone

See also 
 Discover (disambiguation)
 Discoverer (disambiguation)
 Discovery Bay (disambiguation)
 Discovery Channel Pro Cycling Team, a professional cycling team
 Discovery One, a fictional space craft from the film 2001: A Space Odyssey
 HMS Discovery, a list of British and Canadian warships
 Self-discovery